Sebewaing is a village in Huron County in the U.S. state of Michigan.  The population was 1,721 at the 2020 census. The village is within Sebewaing Township. This community is known as the Sugar Beet Capital, due to the Michigan Sugar slicing mill located within the village and the yearly Michigan Sugar Festival. The Sebewaing area, the Thumb, and the state of Michigan overall are major beet sugar producers, mostly for domestic consumption. Sebewaing is also the first gigabit village in the state of Michigan. In 2014–15, Sebewaing completed its fiber to the home network, offering up to gigabit/second speeds over their fiber optic network.

Geography
Its name derives from the Ojibwe word ziibiiweng meaning "place by the river."
It is considered to be part of the Thumb of Michigan, which in turn is a subregion of the Flint/Tri-Cities.

History
Sebewaing's name was derived from the Algonquian language of Native Americans, the original inhabitants of the area. The village was founded in 1845 by Rev. John J.F. Auch, a Lutheran minister sent by the church to do missionary work in the Native American communities.

Beginning in the mid-19th century, the town was settled by many migrants of German ancestry.  In 1880 the E.O. Braendle Brewery began operations. The brewing operation was forced to close during Prohibition, but in 1927 it was renamed, and the Sebewaing Brewing Company  brewed many types of German-style beer in the town until 1965.   The defunct Michigan Brewing company in Webberville, Michigan resurrected some of the brands, using authentic formulae and labels.

Demographics

2010 census
As of the census of 2010, there were 1,759 people, 802 households, and 491 families residing in the village. The racial makeup of the village was 97.5% White, 0.2% Native American, 0.2% Asian, 1.3% from other races, and 0.9% from two or more races. Hispanic or Latino of any race were 4.3% of the population.

There were 802 households, of which 26.2% had children under the age of 18 living with them, 46.8% were married couples living together, 10.0% had a female householder with no husband present, 4.5% had a male householder with no wife present, and 38.8% were non-families. 33.7% of all households were made up of individuals, and 16.7% had someone living alone who was 65 years of age or older. The average household size was 2.19 and the average family size was 2.79.

The median age in the village was 44.9 years. 20.8% of residents were under the age of 18; 7% were between the ages of 18 and 24; 22.4% were from 25 to 44; 29.1% were from 45 to 64; and 20.8% were 65 years of age or older. The gender makeup of the village was 49.2% male and 50.8% female.

2000 census
As of the census of 2000, there were 1,974 people, 868 households, and 547 families residing in the village. The racial makeup of the village was 98.99% White, 0.10% African American, 0.35% Native American, 0.10% Asian, 0.25% from other races, and 0.20% from two or more races. Hispanic or Latino of any race were 3.34% of the population.

There were 868 households, of which 26.7% had children under the age of 18 living with them, 50.9% were married couples living together, 7.9% had a female householder with no husband present, and 36.9% were non-families. 34.2% of all households were made up of individuals, and 19.0% had someone living alone who was 65 years of age or older.  The average household size was 2.27 and the average family size was 2.91.

In the village, the population was spread out, with 22.9% under the age of 18, 7.5% from 18 to 24, 26.3% from 25 to 44, 24.8% from 45 to 64, and 18.4% who were 65 years of age or older. The median age was 41 years. For every 100 females, there were 90.0 males. For every 100 females age 18 and over, there were 87.8 males.

The median income for a household in the village was $32,721, and the median income for a family was $40,742. Males had a median income of $31,619 versus $23,125 for females. The per capita income for the village was $16,894.  About 13.6% of families and 17.5% of the population were below the poverty line, including 32.7% of those under age 18 and 9.7% of those age 65 or over.

Climate
This climatic region has large seasonal temperature differences, with warm to hot (and often humid) summers and cold (sometimes severely cold) winters.  According to the Köppen Climate Classification system, Sebewaing has a humid continental climate, abbreviated "Dfb" on climate maps.

Education
The village is served by Unionville-Sebewaing Area Schools. Unionville-Sebewaing Area High School was formed by the merger of Unionville and Sebewaing High Schools. The nearest tertiary educational institutions are located in Cass City to the east and Bay City to the west.

Notes

External links
Sebewaing webcam, local calendar and events

Villages in Huron County, Michigan
Villages in Michigan
Populated places on Lake Huron in the United States